Daniel "Dani" Iglesias Gago (born 17 July 1995) is a Spanish footballer who plays for FC Dinamo București as an attacking midfielder or a winger.

Club career
Born in Santiago de Compostela, Galicia, Iglesias was a youth product of local Deportivo de La Coruña. He made his debuts as a senior with the reserves, representing the side in the fourth division.

Iglesias made his official debut for the Galicians' first team on 24 August 2013, playing the last 13 minutes in a 0–1 home defeat against Córdoba CF in the second level championship. On 31 July 2015 he rescinded his contract, with Depor having an option to re-sign him until 2018, and signed a four-year deal with Deportivo Alavés on 11 August.

On 1 September 2015 Iglesias was loaned to CD Guadalajara, in a season-long deal.

Following a loan to Istra 1961 in the 2018–19 season, Iglesias transferred to Rijeka in July 2019.

References

External links

1995 births
Living people
Spanish footballers
Spanish expatriate footballers
Spain youth international footballers
Footballers from Santiago de Compostela
Association football wingers
Association football forwards
Deportivo Fabril players
Deportivo de La Coruña players
Deportivo Alavés B players
CD Guadalajara (Spain) footballers
NK Istra 1961 players
HNK Rijeka players
FC Spartak Trnava players
ŠKF Sereď players
FC Dinamo București players
Segunda División players
Segunda División B players
Tercera División players
Croatian Football League players
Slovak Super Liga players
Expatriate footballers in Croatia
Spanish expatriate sportspeople in Croatia
Expatriate footballers in Slovakia
Spanish expatriate sportspeople in Slovakia
Expatriate footballers in Romania
Spanish expatriate sportspeople in Romania